Nuno Alves (born 8 February 1973) is a Portuguese male weightlifter, competing in the 62 kg category and representing Portugal at international competitions. He participated at the 1996 Summer Olympics in the 59 kg event. He competed at world championships, most recently at the 1998 World Weightlifting Championships.

Major results

References

External links
 

1973 births
Living people
Portuguese male weightlifters
Weightlifters at the 1996 Summer Olympics
Olympic weightlifters of Portugal
Place of birth missing (living people)